In mathematics, the nil-Coxeter algebra,  introduced by , is an algebra similar to the group algebra of a Coxeter group except that the generators are nilpotent.

Definition

The nil-Coxeter algebra for the infinite symmetric group is the algebra generated by u1, u2, u3, ... with the relations

 

These are just the relations for the infinite braid group, together with the relations u = 0. Similarly one can define a nil-Coxeter algebra for any Coxeter system, by adding the relations u = 0 to the relations of the corresponding generalized braid group.

References

Representation theory